Zhuravka is a rural locality (selo) and the administrative center of Zhuravskoye Rural Settlement, Kantemirovsky  District, Voronezh Oblast, Russia. The population was 722, as of 2010. There are five streets.

Geography 
Kasyanovka is the nearest rural locality.

References 

Rural localities in Kantemirovsky District